This is a timeline of the war in Donbas for the year 2014.

April–June
 7 April: At 3:30 am, a group of pro-Russian activists stormed the SBU offices in Donetsk and Luhansk. They did not make any clear demands. The militants took control of the SBU armoury and armed themselves with automatic weapons, and other supporters brought bricks and other debris to erect barricades. Their numbers were initially at 1,000 but subsequently thinned. In an address on the Ukrainian national television channel, interim President Oleksandr Turchynov stated that the current unrest in eastern Ukraine was "the second wave" of a Russian operation to destabilise Ukraine, overthrow the government and disrupt planned elections and an attempt by Russia to "dismember" Ukraine. He also vowed to launch a major "counter-terrorism" operation against separatist movements in the country's eastern regions.
 8 April: In Luhansk, separatists occupying the SBU building declared themselves the "Luhansk Parliamentary Republic". According to Ukrainian security officials, the separatists planted mines in the building and took 60 people hostage.
 11 April: In Mariupol, a pro-Ukrainian flashmob of 100 took place outside the police department. Protesters were attacked by men with bats and the police did not react.
 12 April: Fifty two armed militants led by Igor Girkin (retired colonel of Russia's intelligence FSB) attacked the executive committee building, the police department, and the Security Service of Ukraine offices in Sloviansk. His militia was formed in Crimea and consisted of volunteers from Russia, Crimea, but also from other regions of Ukraine (Vinnytsia, Zhytomyr, Kyiv) and many people from Donetsk and the Luhansk region. Two thirds were Ukrainian citizens. The majority of men in the unit had combat experience. Many of those with Ukrainian citizenship had fought in the Russian Armed Forces in Chechnya and Central Asia. Others fought in Iraq and the former Yugoslavia with the Ukrainian Armed Forces. The original intention of Igor Girkin and his men was the repetition of the Crimean scenario (the seizure of the territory by Russian army). According to Girkin, nobody fought for the Donetsk People's Republic or the Luhansk People's Republic, everybody initially wanted to join Russia. Girkin flew Russian flag at his headquarters and his men were perceived as Russian forces by the local population. Girkin believed that the Russian Armed Forces and the Russian state would quickly follow and the Donbas would become another republic within Russia. In Kramatorsk, in the course of a Pro-Russian rally, protestors overpowered a police line and took over the building of the local executive committee, where they hoisted the flag of the new-proclaimed republic. At evening, the local police station was captured by armed men in camouflage fatigues after a protracted firefight.
 15 April: In accordance with the Ukrainian law on fighting the terrorism Ukraine's acting President Olexander Turchynov announced the start of "anti-terrorist operation" (abbreviation: ATO) against pro-Russian separatists. An armoured column sent by Ukraine established a checkpoint 40 km from Sloviansk. The SBU claimed that the rebels there had been reinforced by several hundred soldiers from Russia's Main Intelligence Directorate. Ukrainian special forces retook Kramatorsk airfield from pro-Russian troops. According to Ukrainian officials there were no fatalities on either side, while rebel reports varies from two militiamen wounded to eleven dead.
 16 April: Six BMD-2 armoured vehicles were captured by Pro-Russian militias after being stopped at a rebel checkpoint near Kramatorsk. They were later seen driven by masked Pro-Russian troops to Sloviansk. The Ukrainian Ministry of Defence confirmed the loss. In Mariupol, 300 pro-Russian insurgents attempted to take a military base and demanded soldiers turn over their weapons. They threw petrol bombs at base guards. After firing warning shots, police together with the national guard and Omega units returned fire. According to Interior Minister Arsen Avakov, three insurgents were killed and 13 wounded, while 63 were arrested; no Ukrainian officers were killed in the battle.
 20 April: On orders from acting President Oleksandr Turchinov, Dmytro Yarosh led 20 Right Sector members to sabotage an insurgent-controlled television tower in Sloviansk, leading to the first combat fatalities in the Siege of Sloviansk. Yarosh denied his role in these events until two years later.
 21 April: In Luhansk, separatists announced two referendums, one on 11 May to decide on whether to gain autonomy or whether to retain the current status of the region and a second on 18 May on whether to join Russia or declare independence.
 25 April:  Two Ukrainian aircraft -an Mi-8 helicopter and an An-2 plane- were destroyed in an apparent RPG attack claimed by Pro-Russian militias at the airport of Kramatorsk, where the control tower was also damaged. The explosion injured one Ukrainian officer.
 27 April: Separatists in Luhansk proclaimed the "Luhansk People's Republic".
 2 May: At dawn, Ukrainian forces launched a large-scale operation to retake Sloviansk. There were reports of gunfire, explosions, and a military helicopter opening fire, and separatists said one Mi-24 helicopter had been shot down, and one of the pilots captured. Separatist authorities said that three militants and two civilians were killed in the clashes. The Ukrainian Ministry of Internal Affairs reports that up to nine checkpoints around Sloviansk were seized. They also acknowledge the shooting down of two helicopters and the death of two airmen. Seven servicemen were wounded. The fighting died down by afternoon.
 5 May: Fighting continued in Slavyansk, where a Ukrainian Mi-24 helicopter was shot down by a heavy machine gun manned by the rebels and crashed into a river; its crew survived. The Ukrainian government accused the pro-Russian separatists of using heavy weapons, including mortars.
 7 May: After a day of clashes, that involved an ambush against Ukrainian forces and the death of two militants, Pro-Russian demonstrators re-occupied the Mariupol city hall after the Ukrainian security forces withdrew from the building. They were later attacked by special troops using tear gas, which according to pro-Russian sources left 15 people affected. A pro-Russian spokeswoman said that five militants were killed and 15 captured during the Ukrainian operation to retake the city.
 9 May: There were deadly clashes at Mariupol, where 60 separatists attempted to take over the police station. The attack was fought off, but the building was left in flames. The Ukrainian Internal Affairs Ministry claim that 20 rebels were killed, and four captured. The Ukrainians acknowledge one killed and five wounded. It was later learned that the police superintendent had been abducted by the militiamen.
 10 May: The Ministry of Defence of Ukraine announced the deaths of a Lieutenant Colonel and an artillery soldier during the battle at Mariupol. The vehicle of the Colonel was ambushed while en route to the police station, while the soldier was killed in the assault of the building.
 11 May: Two independence referendums were held in the self-proclaimed republics of Donetsk and Luhansk. In Donetsk, the organizers stated that 89% voted in favour of self-rule, with 10% against, on a turnout of nearly 75%. In Luhansk, the organizers stated that 96.2% voted for separation. These results could not be independently verified.
 22 May: At Volnovakha, Donetsk Oblast, 16 Ukrainian soldiers were killed and 12 wounded when separatists attacked the checkpoint they were manning with machine gun fire, hand grenades, rocket propelled grenades and mortar rounds. Later, another two soldiers died of wounds, bringing the Ukrainian death toll to 18. A pro-Russian officer, Colonel Igor Bezler, claimed that he led the ambush, and showed weapons and identification cards of two Ukrainian soldiers allegedly captured after the battle, in an improvised press conference in Horlivka. He also acknowledged the death of one of his subordinates. Fighting continued around Mount Karachun, near Slavyansk.
 26 May: Fierce fighting erupted at Donetsk airport at 13:00 local time, after separatists who had earlier stormed the facilities ignored a Ukrainian ultimatum to withdraw. There was an airstrike carried out by Mi-24 helicopters, Sukhoi 25 and MiG-29 aircraft, and Ukrainian paratroopers were landed to evict the separatists. Ukrainian officials claimed that an antiaircraft gun was destroyed. Converserly, sources from the Donetsk republic reported the shooting down of two helicopters. Both sides claimed to be in control of the airport after the battle died down at late evening. They also acknowledged an indeterminate number of casualties. The local mortuary had 36 bodies of people killed during the battle, 33 of them pro-Russian militants. Donetsk Mayor, Oleksander Lukyanchenko, reported 43 wounded in local hospitals as result of the clashes.
 29 May: A Ukrainian Mi-8 helicopter was shot down by separatist forces between Kramatorsk and Mount Karachun, killing 14 people on board, among them General Vladimir Kultchysky. Another soldier was seriously injured.
 30 May: According to the State Border Guard Service of Ukraine, there was an attempt to break through the Ukrainian national border from the Russian side in Stanytsia-Luhanska. On 29 May armed personnel started gathering not far from the checkpoint and set a number of barricades. Around 300 armed men surrounded the outpost. At 12:30 AM, the armed men opened fire in the direction of the Ukrainian border guards. They were shooting assault rifles and grenade launchers. State border guards returned fire. One guard was injured by shrapnel. State border guards claimed that at the same time at least four ambulances were seen coming to the place from where the armed men opened fire. According to Ukrainian officials, separatist forces were firing upon residential areas of Sloviansk from a 2S23 "Nona-SVK" self-propelled 120 mm mortar. Another attack was organised from inside Ukrainian territory at a border post near Dyakovo (south of Antratsyt). Dozens of mortar shells were fired, wounding three. Russian Cossacks were involved in the assault.
 31 May: At Sloviansk, Ukrainian forces claimed to have knocked down the 2S23 "Nona-SVK" self-propelled 120 mm mortar which had been shelling Ukrainian positions on a daily basis.
 2 June: Rebels launched a large attack against a command center of the Ukrainian border guards just south of Luhansk. 5 rebels were killed and 8 were wounded, while 7 border guards were wounded. Contact between the guards and their headquarters was lost after an agreed 20-minute truce ended. Russian media reported that between 10 and 15 border guards surrendered to pro-Russian militants, however the Ukrainian government claimed that jets destroyed the militants' equipment and positions ending the attack. The base was eventually captured by the separatists on 4 June.  The Ukrainian Air Force conducted an airstrike against enemy mortar positions in Luhansk Oblast, claiming two separatists were killed. An air strike on Luhansk RSA was also conducted killing eight civilians. Ukraine's government claimed that it was a misfired missile shot by separatists. According to the OSCE "these strikes were the result of non-guided rockets shot from an aircraft".
 Petro Poroshenko became president of Ukraine.
 6 June: Separatist militias from Slaviansk shot down an An-30 surveillance plane with two shoulder-launched missiles. Ukrainian authorities initially claimed that the pilots survived, but they later reported that five crewmembers were killed in the action, and two others missing. Fighting continued meanwhile on the ground at Slavyansk itself.
 13 June: Ukrainian officials claimed that their troops wrestled control of Mariupol from pro-Russian militants. They destroyed an armoured vehicle and captured about 30 prisoners. A Ukrainian APC with 8 Ukrainian servicemen aboard violated the Russian border. The APC broke down and another vehicle followed to retrieve the servicemen. This was not the first border incursion into Russia by Ukrainian troops (according to Russia). Previously, Russian airspace was breached by the Ukrainian airforce.
 14 June: Ukrainian officials stated that an Il-76 transport plane was shot down by separatists as it approached an airport in Luhansk, killing nine crewmembers and 40 troops on board. Residents said that Ukrainian forces launched air attacks on separatist positions in the vicinity a few hours later.  The press service of the Donetsk People's Republic stated that a Ukrainian Su-24 bomber was shot down near Horlivka.
 17 June: Spokesman for the Ukrainian National Security and Defense Council Volodymyr Chepovy claimed that Ukraine had conducted "a series of successful operations over the past 24 hours" to regain control over the Russia–Ukraine border in which "about 80 militants have been neutralized". He also announced that the National Guard had been deployed the day before "at the state border and in populated areas of Donetsk region". A Ukrainian mortar attack killed two Russian reporters in the village of Metalist, Luhansk Oblast. It was later claimed that one of the victims had entered Ukraine illegally. Four Ukrainian soldiers from the battalion "Aidar" also died during the clashes there.
 18 June: Ukrainian Army spokesman Vladislav Seleznev announced that a Ukrainian T-64B tank was hit and damaged by separatists around Slaviansk, where he claimed that several pro-Russian firing positions were cleared and a number of separatists killed or wounded.
 21 June: Three Ukrainian border outposts in Donetsk and Luhansk were attacked by separatists. Some 80 Ukrainian border guards at Izvaryne were evicted from their post and fled across the border with Russia, six of them wounded. Two of the wounded suffered critical injuries. The wounded were repatriated, but the rest of the Ukrainian personnel was held in custody and interrogated by Russian authorities.
 24 June: The Ukrainian military said one of its helicopters, a Mi-8, has been shot down by pro-Russian militants in the east near Slaviansk, killing all nine people on board, while two other soldiers were killed and four wounded during the militant shelling of a checkpoint in the same area.
 26 June: A large separatist armoured column, composed of eight tanks, as well as mortars, attacked a Ukrainian checkpoint near Kramatorsk, killing four soldiers and wounding five. They also destroyed four Ukrainian armoured vehicles. Ukraine claimed that one pro-Russian tank was destroyed and one was captured by the Ukrainian military. A pro-Russian tank rammed a roadblock, forcing the soldiers manning it to disperse. Ukraine claimed that another pro-Russian tank was hit by an RPG.
 27 June: The United Nations refugee agency found that over 110,000 people had fled from Ukraine to Russia, and that tens of thousands more were internally displaced. Of those that fled, about 9,600 had filed for asylum.
 29 June: Pro-Russian forces engaged Ukrainian positions in Mount Karachun using tanks and mortars.

July–September
 1 July:  The Ukrainian military renewed their attack to drive out pro-Russian rebels from the areas under their control in the early morning, staging large-scale ground and air assaults in eastern Ukraine throughout the day. The Ukrainian military conducted heavy artillery barrages on the rebel-controlled city of Slovyansk. The villages of Stary-Karavan and Brusivka, south of Krasnyi Lyman, were brought back under government control. South-west of Slovyansk, near Andriivka, the television tower on Mount Karachun collapsed after rebel forces shelled Ukrainian positions nearby.
 3 July: Another Russian border post in Novoshahtinks was damaged by rockets fired from Ukraine. This was the second incident of this kind in Novoshahtinsk since 20 June.
 4 July: Members of the Ukrainian battalion "Donetsk" launched a raid on the seat of the local prosecutor in Artemivsk, occupied by pro-Russian forces. Two armoured personnel carriers fired on the building during 20 minutes, destroying a civilian type vehicle and causing some damage. The armoured vehicles later retreated toward the Kharkiv-Rostov highway. Artemivsk was retaken by Ukrainian forces the following day.
 5 July: Pro-Russian forces abandoned the town of Sloviansk and retreated towards Donetsk city in the face of a Ukrainian army encirclement. The Ukrainian flag was hoisted over the city council building. An armed group in two vessels and several small craft landed near the town of Sjedove, on the Azov Sea shore, and destroyed a Ukrainian border post and radar station with RPG, mortar and small arms fire. One Ukrainian guard was killed and eight wounded.
 6 July: Separatist sources from the Republic of Donetsk claimed that a Ukrainian T-64 was knocked down by pro-Russian tanks during a battle in Dmytrivka, near the border with Russia.
 9 July: Pro-Russian forces put Luhansk airport under siege. The facilities were shelled using four tanks and two "Grad" rocket launchers. Ukrainian sources claimed that two tanks and one "Grad" system were destroyed in the course of an air strike.
 11 July: Pro-Russian forces attacked a concentration of Ukrainian troops with "Grad" rockets, inflicted heavy damage and casualties to two motorised army brigades at Zelenopyllia, Luhansk Oblast, south of Rovenky. At least 19 Ukrainian soldiers were reported killed, and around 100 other wounded. Fighting was still ongoing by evening. It was later claimed that the rocket system used in the attack was the newer 9A52-4 "Tornado". Four other Ukrainian servicemen were killed near Dolzhanskyi border post, in Luhansk Oblast, which was in ruins since 9 July, when the facilities were hit by a barrage of 200 rounds from 120 mm mortars.
One civilian died, and two were seriously injured. An investigation into the matter is ongoing. The Russian Foreign Ministry warned of "irreversible consequences, the responsibility of which lies on the Ukrainian side", calling the shelling "an aggressive action".
The Ukrainian defence minister claimed that the altitude is far from the reach of a shoulder-launched missile, suggesting that the aircraft was downed by Russian forces. Two crewmembers were captured by pro-Russian militiamen, four were rescued by Ukrainian forces and the other two were unaccounted for. The missing aviators were found dead on 17 July.
 16 July: A Ukrainian Su-25 fighter was shot down over eastern Ukraine by a Russian Air Force Su-27, according to the spokesman of Ukraine's National Security Council, Andriy Lysenko. The pilot ejected successfully. The Ukrainian army transferred 15 wounded soldiers from the 72nd armoured brigade (misreport of 72nd Guards Mechanized Brigade?) to Gukovo, Russia, for medical assistance. The brigade, surrounded by rebel forces in the border town of Chervonopartizansk, had no chance of evacuating the men to Ukrainian hospitals. Other two Ukrainian servicemen from the National Guard were rescued with severe injuries by members of the Russian Federal Security Service in the border area of Kuybyshevsky District, Rostov Oblast. One guard died later from his wounds, while four of the soldiers were in critical condition. All the Ukrainian personnel was put under arrest.  Also on the border, the outpost of Izvarine was "cleared of Ukrainian troops", according to the self-proclaimed Ministry of Defence of the Republic of Donetsk, Igor Strelkov. There were reports of more than 200 fatalities among the Ukrainian forces in this area of the border. Andriy Lysenko acknowledge that "there was not possible" to establish the real number of victims at the moment.
Both the Ukrainian military and the opposition have stated that they are not responsible for the incident. The White House confirmed that the United States is investigating what happened and that it is believed the plane involved was a Boeing 777. Malaysian Deputy Foreign Minister Hamzah Zainuddin said that the foreign ministry would be working closely with the Russian and Ukrainian governments regarding the incident.
 23 July: Two Ukrainian Air Force Su-25 fighters were shot down in the rebel-held area of Savur-Mohyla. Ukrainian authorities claimed that they were hit by long-range antiaircraft missiles launched from Russia. Ukrainian Prime Minister, Arseniy Yatsenyuk, said later in an interview that one of the fighters was probably shot down by an air-to-air missile.
 27 July: The US State Department produced satellite photos proving that Russian artillery had fired on Ukrainian territory. The photo for show of 21 Julys the marks left by separatist multiple rocket launchers ( and ) near Hryhorivka with impacts on Ukrainian positions ( and ) in Marynivka. The picture for 23 July views self-propelled artillery south-west of Nova Nadezhda in Russia and a shelled Ukrainian unit east of Dibrivka. The image for 25/show of 26 Julys blast marks of multiple rocket launchers also south-west of Nova Nadezhda in Russia and impacts on Ukrainian forces south-east of Dibrivka. Later Ukrainian SBU released more detailed photos but mil.ru slide by slide show they origin and dates (and on some content) were doctored. Ukrainian Minister of Defence Valeriy Geletey acknowledged that 41 Ukrainian soldiers from the 51st armoured brigade deserted from their besieged border outpost and sought shelter into Russian territory.
 29 July: CNN reported, citing US officials, that the Ukrainian army fired three OTR-21 Tochka tactical ballistic missiles at pro-Russian militias near the town of Snizhne during the past 48 hours. Twenty-one soldiers from the 24th armoured brigade, who had been evacuated through the Russian region of Kuibyshev after enduring heavy "Grad" rocket attacks, arrived in Zaporozhie, home of the brigade's headquarters. Several of them suffered from shell shock.
 31 July: Ukrainian sources acknowledged that Savur-Mohyla changed hands several times in the last days. They also claimed that Russian forces would cross the border under the pretense of being "peacekeeping troops".
 1 August: The Ukrainian army withdrew its troops from several areas along the border with Russia, like Dovzhansky, Izvaryne and Chervonopartyzansk, where the daily shelling and "Grad" rocket fire made their positions untenable. The 79th and 72nd airborne brigades, deployed around Dyakovo, were among the retreating units.
 3 August: Armed Forces of Ukraine announced that they have split the Donetsk and Luhansk controlled areas, separating the two rebel republics. On the border, Ukrainian units were shelled again from Russia. Near Chervonopartyzansk, soldiers of the 72nd Mechanized Brigade endured six hours of heavy artillery fire. The next day, the bulk of the brigade, encircled near Chervonopartyzansk on the border east of Sverdlovsk succeeded for the most part to break through to Ukrainian-held territory; other soldiers who covered the departure finally escaped to a Russian border post in Gukovo. Between 311 (according to Ukrainian officials), 438 (according to Russian FSB sources) and 449 (as per OSCE observers) Ukrainian soldiers and border guards laid down their weapons and crossed into Russia since 2 August.
 7 August: Pro-Russian forces shot down a Ukrainian Air Force MiG-29 with a "Buk" surface-to-air missile near the town of Yenakievo. The pilot managed to eject, and separatist sources later claimed he was captured and interrogated. Meanwhile, a Mi-8 helicopter used for medical evacuation was forced to crash-land after being hit by rebel gunfire.
 8 August: The town of Amvrosiivka and the Ukrainian checkpoints around it were shelled by Russian troops across the border for 20 minutes.
 9 August:  There was a multiple-weapon assault from Russia on the border checkpoint of Milove, Luhansk Oblast. The attackers used RPO-A Shmel flamethrowers and mine-scattering shells. Four Ukrainian guards were injured when they stepped on mines.
 10 August: Pro-Russian forces repelled a Ukrainian army assault led by four battalions on the rebel-held town of Ilovaysk.
 16 August: Although Russia denies aiding or sending troops into Ukraine Alexander Zakharchenko, the newly appointed leader of the self-proclaimed Donetsk People's Republic admitted in a video released on 16 August that the rebel forces were in the process of receiving 150 armoured vehicles, including about 30 tanks, which may refer to the column of Russian vehicles seen crossing into Ukraine earlier. Moreover, he stated that 1,200 new fighters who spent 4 months training in Russia would be joining his forces. He did not specify where the vehicles would come from. The video was recorded on 15 August. On 18 August Zakharchenko claimed that all military equipment of the Donetsk People's Republic was taken from the Ukrainian military "The hardware that our enemy gives us by abandoning it is enough for us".
 17 August: Fierce fighting was reported around Savur-Mohyla hill, where pro-Russian forces launched a major counter-attack. Separatist militias from Luhansk shot down a Mikoyan MiG-29 aircraft.
 19 August: The commander of the Donbas Battalion, Semen Semenchenko, was wounded in battle in the town of Ilovaisk. Minister of Internal Affairs, Arsen Avakov, announced that Semenchevo will be awarded the order of Bogdan Khmelnitsky. He suffered shrapnel injuries in his hip and back, and underwent a successful surgery at a Dnipropetrovsk hospital. After an increasing number of casualties, including four soldiers killed, the battalion left the battlefield later that day.
 20 August: Ukrainian troops repulsed a tank attack in the area of Ilovaisk, and managed to recapture most of the city.
 22 August: The first Russian humanitarian convoy, parked for several days at Izvaryne checkpoint, eventually moved into Ukraine without the permission of the Ukrainian authorities. The convoy passed through Krasnodon, Samsonivka, Lyse, Burchak-Myhailivka and Nikolaevka via dirt roads before reaching Luhansk city.
 23 August: According to Reuters correspondent this day could be considered for Russian special forces, and the GRU, the "dealer", as a day of "play again" the "Crimean scenario" – reportedly the "little green men", dozens of heavily armed strangers with Russian accents, set up a road block  at the weekend southwest of Amvrosiivka, near the settlement of Kolosky, about 10 kilometres from the Russian border.
 24 August: Ukrainian media reported that Russian army's armoured forces equipped with 250 vehicles and artillery entered the town of Amvrosiivka, in what seemed to be a major offensive against Mariupol. Earlier, five pro-Russian tanks, supported by "Grad" rocket fire, had overrun a Ukrainian checkpoint at the village of Olenivka. The town of Telmanovo was also allegedly taken over by separatist forces, but this information was strongly denied by Ukrainian officials.
 25 August: Ukraine claimed that Russian armoured forces, under the disguise of pro-Russian militants, had invaded the area surrounding Novoazovsk, and that fierce battles were ongoing around the villages of Shcherbak and Markyne. The Russian column consisted of 10 tanks, two armoured fighting vehicles and two Ural trucks. According to the same sources, the offensive had been blocked with two Russian tanks destroyed and 10 members of "an intelligence-sabotage group" seized. The surviving vehicles broke in the direction of Telmanovo. At evening, fighting continued to rage at Shcherbak and Huselshchykove. The commander of the "Donbas" battalion, Semen Semenchenko, reported that the strength of the Russian column was 50 vehicles, and that some of them headed towards the area of Amvrosiivka.  In Illovaisk, the commander of Ukraine's "Kherson" battalion was killed in battle.
 26 August: Ukraine captured 10 Russian paratroopers near Dzerkalne (20 km away from the Russian border) who according to Russia "crossed [the Ukrainian border] by accident on an unmarked section" and according to Ukraine "were carrying out a special mission". Fighting in the Novoazovsk area continued. Ukrainian media reported that 30 Russian tanks, armoured personnel carriers and infantry from Taganrog took over six villages around Novoazovsk, but this was initially denied by Ukrainian officials. The separatists claimed that they took control of the road section between the village of Kuznetzovo-Mykhailivka, in Telmanovo region, and the town of Novoazovsk.
 27 August: Rebels shelled the Government held town of Novoazovsk as a counter-offensive on government held parts of the region and was able to push into the port of Novoazovsk.  Ukrainian military sources acknowledged that rebel and Russian forces captured seven settlements north and northeast of Novoazovsk. They also admitted the fall of Starobesheve, southeast of Donetsk city, to "Russian occupiers". At evening it was learned from the commander of a Ukrainian army special company in the area that Russian tanks had overrun Novoazovsk and that Russian troops were in control of the town. The Ukrainian navy command ship Donbas shot down a Russian drone in the Azov sea, off Mariupol. Savur-Mohyla hill was also taken over by pro-Russian forces after several days of fighting.
 29 August: Another Su-25 fighter was shot down in eastern Ukraine by a surface-to-air missile. The pilot ejected safely.
 30 August: According to Semen Semenchenko, Ukrainian President Petro Poroshenko agreed with pro-Russian rebels to use a corridor to withdraw the Ukrainian troops besieged at Illovaisk. The troops would be allowed to flee carrying with them their side arms and battle flags. The Ukrainian who had been taken prisoners would be exchanged later for Russian troops at Kharkiv. Earlier, the Ukrainian Security Council had acknowledged that their forces were completely surrounded at Illovaisk. The following day, Russian-backed forces destroyed a column of more than 30 military vehicles in and around the village of Novokaterynivka near Starobesheve south east of Donetsk. The column was apparently retreating south after being encircled in the closing stages of the Battle of Ilovaisk. The circumstances of the conflict are disputed. Ukrainian forces accused pro-Russian rebels of reneging in safe passage for encircled Ukrainian troops. Ukrainian battalions claim that pro-Russians killed 'hundreds' and took dozens prisoner after Ukrainian forces came with white flags. The rebel side reported that they broke the agreement and did not surrender heavy equipment, a condition set for a safe retreat. The condition of retreat were communicated as retreat with heavy equipment by BBC. Some troops from Illovaisk area had broken the encirclement in small groups up to company size and escaped to the Ukrainian army frontline.
 1 September: Ukrainian Minister of Defense Valeriy Geletey declared that the ATO (anti-terrorist operation) was over, and that Ukraine is now facing a "Russian full-scale invasion". He stressed the need to "build a defense against Russia not only in the areas formerly occupied by terrorists, but also in other regions of the country". Advisor of the Ministry of Internal Affairs Anton Heraschenko said that the Russian invasion didn't start with the offensive on Novoazovsk on 27 August, but with the assault of two Russian airborne divisions from Ryazan and Kostroma into the areas of Savur-Mohyla and Amvrosiivka on 24 August. After enduring several assaults for weeks, Ukrainian troops are forced to retreat from Luhansk airport and other locations including Shchastia, the last Ukrainian stronghold around Luhansk city.
 4 September: Ukrainian troops also left the town Debal'tsevo under separatist and Russian pressure, according to a battalion commander, amid fears of being encircled into another pocket like in the area of Ilovaisk.
 5 September: In Minsk representatives of Ukraine and pro-Russian rebels signed the Minsk Protocol, which established a ceasefire that entered into force at 18:00 local time.
 10 September: Ukrainian sources reported that the Donetsk airport was successfully defended against an assault by pro-Russian armoured forces overnight. Heavy shelling resumed on three districts of Donetsk city at evening.
 14 September: Pro-Russian forces, supported by six tanks and "Grad" rocket fire, attempted to storm the airport of Donetsk once again. Additionally, the city's Mayor said that the districts of Kuibyshev and Kyiv were hit by heavy shelling. There were civilian casualties. It was later learned that three Ukrainian soldiers were killed and several wounded in the assault on the airport.
 19 September: A memorandum was signed in Minsk between the parts which had agreed on 5 September ceasefire. The nine-point document established a 30 km buffer zone dividing the warring factions, where all weapons with a calibre exceeding 100 mm will be banned.
 22 September: Ukrainian troops in Donetsk airport repelled a pro-Russian assault led by tanks and supported by "Tyulpan" self-propelled mortars. In Donetsk city, heavy bombardment killed one civilian in the district of Kuybishev. Several houses and gas pipelines were damaged.
 23 September: Ukrainian forces built a defensive line in Mariupol from the eastern outskirts of the city to the town of Volnovakha, where a pro-Russian offensive from the direction of Novotroitske was halted the day before.
 25 September: Donetsk airport was struck by heavy shelling at late evening, as well as Donetsk city's district of Kyiv. Large fires could be seen at both locations.
 26 September: Fierce fighting was reported around Donetsk airport, and in Debaltseve a Ukrainian outpost and a number of civilian houses were attacked with "Grad" rockets. Ukrainian troops returned fire. A meeting between Ukrainian and pro-Russian officers took place at Soledar, Donetsk Oblast, to talk about the implementation of the artillery buffer zone and the clearing of minefields in accordance with the Minsk agreements.
 28 September: The commander of a company of the Ukrainian army's 93rd armoured brigade, the main unit defending Donetsk airport, was killed in the course of a pro-Russian tank assault on the facilities.
 30 September: Pro-Russian tanks attacked Donetsk airport at 6:15 a.m. In the region of Mariupol, Ukrainian Marines claimed to have destroyed a separatist truck and a mortar position at Hranitne. Ukrainian forces lost a total of 1,159 armoured vehicles of all types between July and September.

October–December 
 1 October:   Donetsk city council reported the death of nine civilians and injuries on another 30 as a result of heavy shelling. One artillery round landed on a bus station in the district of Kyiv, killing six people and wounding 25. Other three people were killed and five wounded when a school was hit in the same area. Pro-Russian militias stormed Donetsk airport, briefly capturing two buildings in the airport terminal. According to Ukrainian sources, there were four attempts by the rebels to break through the defensive lines. They succeeded in taking over the terminal on one occasion, but were eventually evicted by the Ukrainian defenders. The Ukrainian army claimed that seven militants were killed and ten wounded in the action. There were no Ukrainian casualties.
 3 October: The old terminal of Donetsk airport was stormed by pro-Russian troops, who used smoke grenades. The first floor of the building was occupied by the attackers, only to be retaken by Ukrainian forces some time later. Part of the building was set ablaze. One Ukrainian soldier died and three were injured during the action. Earlier, Ukrainian media reported as many as five servicemen killed. At early morning, Ukrainian troops and residential areas in Debaltseve came under an intense "Grad" rocket barrage. Several houses were damaged.
 4 October: Pro-Russian forces carried out two assaults on Donetsk airport supported by artillery and tanks, but their attempts were beaten off by the Ukrainian army.
 8 October: Separatist sources claimed that their forces were closing the circle around the Ukrainian troops in Debaltseve from the west and northwest. They reported that the rebels are using a 2S3 Akatsiya self-propelled howitzer captured from the Ukrainian army.
 10 October: Shelling in Donetsk city killed three civilian residents and wounded another five. Artillery shells hit the districts of Kuybishev, Kyiv and Leninsky.
 14 October: Seven civilians were killed and 17 wounded in Sartana, northeast of Mariupol, as result of separatist "Grad" rockets fired from the village of Kominternove. The local city council declared 15 October a day of mourning to honour the victims. Artillery fire resumed afternoon against the Ukrainian checkpoint in nearby Talakovka, where several houses were set on fire the day before. Members of a self-dubbed "Army of the Don", who did not follow orders from the Luhansk people's republic and apparently proceeded under their own initiative, launched 20 "Grad" rocket salvos on four Ukrainian checkpoints around Bakhmutka, Luhansk Oblast. Hours later they launched an offensive on Ukrainian redoubts involving the use of tanks, anti-tank missiles and rocket propelled grenades. Three Ukrainian armoured vehicles were knocked down, and Cossack troops ordered a Ukrainian National Guard outpost to surrender, demanding that the guards hand over their positions. One guard was reported killed and five other wounded.
 18 October: In the village of Smile, in the area of Bakhmutka, two Ukrainian servicemen were wounded in a renewed pro-Russian assault on a security checkpoint. The attack was beaten off after a four-hour battle. Earlier, the Ukrainian military acknowledged that 11 soldiers were missing after the beginning of the pro-Russian offensive on 15 October. The sources claimed that they knew the whereabouts of two of the troops. It was later learned that the missing were members of the "Aidar" battalion and that six of the men were recovered by friendly forces.
 19 October: n the area of Smile fierce fighting was reported by both sides. Ukrainian media said that the rebels attempted to erect a blockroad and ambushed supply convoys to the Ukrainian checkpoints in the zone. At evening, the militias launched an offensive supported by tanks. Some 200 Ukrainian troops were surrounded by pro-Russian forces according to the separatists.
 22 October: Ukraine's Ministry of Defence announced that they still unknown the whereabouts of five of the soldiers who went missing on 16 October, during the pro-Russian offensive on Smile. Three armoured carriers they were riding on were destroyed in combat.
 27 October: During the day, the Ukrainian army evacuated checkpoint No. 32, carrying all their equipment with them. The checkpoint, near the village of Smile, had been surrounded by pro-Russian militias since mid-October. The relief column which carried out the rescue also recovered the remains of at least four soldiers killed in action. The Ukrainian military later acknowledged that ten soldiers had died in the outpost since September, and that "several others" were still missing.
 1 November: In Mariupol, Ukrainian tanks returned fire on rebel positions and successfully engaged enemy tanks, according to Ukrainian sources on the field.
 15 November: Separatist sources claimed that their troops destroyed one tank and five armoured personnel carriers in Donetsk airport.
 17 November: The airport of Donetsk and the surrounding region were the target of rebel artillery fire. The airport itself and the town of Pisky were attacked with mortars and tanks, and heavy shelling was reported in other settlements like Avdiivka, Maiorsk, Maryinka, Krasnohoryvka, Slavne and Taramchuk. The Ukrainian military claimed that return fire killed at least 20 militants. In Luhansk Oblast there was harassing fire on Ukrainian troops around Stanytsia Luhanska, and the town of Shchastya was hit by "Grad" rockets. In the city of Donetsk local authorities reported one civilian resident killed and eight wounded over the weekend as a consequence of shelling in the district of Kyiv. Ukrainian officials said that pro-Russian forces were set to take control of Bakhmutka road, which would have allowed the separatists to threaten Shchastya from the west. "Grad" rockets and mortar rounds were fired on Ukrainian roadblocks in Krimsky, Novoaidar and Trokhizbenka. Ukrainian positions at Hirske were hit by rocket-propelled grenades and mortars, while a checkpoint near Frunze was attacked with antitank missiles.
 29 November: Separatist infantry launched an attack on Donetsk airport, supported by "Grad" rocket fire.
 1 December: Luhansk Governor Hennadiy Moskal said that right after a "Grad" rocket attack on the city, rebel militias burst onto downtown Stanytsia Luhanska, where an intense firefight erupted with Ukrainian security forces. The town council and other buildings were damaged. Eight other settlements in Luhansk Oblast were the target of mortar, artillery and multiple rocket fire. Ukrainian media published videos of separatist "Grad" launchers firing on Pisky from behind apartment buildings at Maksyma Kozyrya street in Donetsk.
 3 December: A volley of "Grad" rockets fired from Sakhanka hit Ukrainian outposts around Mariupol at noon, specially in the eastern district of the city and the village of Talakovka. A number of Ukraine's National Guard soldiers were wounded.
 5 December:  Rebel militias carried out two assaults on Donetsk airport using tanks, grenade launchers and small arms. They briefly wrestled control of the old terminal from the Ukrainian defenders, but the paratroopers retook the building by evening.
 9 December: Since 9:00 am a renewed "silent mode" was agreed between the Ukrainian military and separatist militias, pending further agreement in talks which would take place in Minsk in the next few days.
 12 December: Members of the "Azov" battalion in Hnutove said they learned from local residents that pro-Russian armoured units had broken into the village of Pavlopil, where they raised the flag of "Novorossiya". According to the Ukrainian soldiers, a patrol of scouts sent to investigate was ambushed when they tried to enter the occupied settlement. Two servicemen were reported killed and three wounded during the engagement, and a light vehicle hit a landmine. The militias also suffered casualties, and withdrew from the battlefield. They came back supported by armoured vehicles which sprayed the village with heavy fire, in the belief that Ukrainian troops were entrenched in the main buildings. The OSCE mission later confirmed that militiamen from the Donetsk people's republic forced them to withdraw from Pavlopil.
 22 December: Luhansk Governor Hennady Moskal reported eight attacks in the region up to 8 am. According to him, pro-Russian forces used mortars, artillery and "Grad" rockets to pound Shchastya and Krimsky. Between 7 and 10 am, Krimsky was the target of antitank missiles and "Grad" rockets. No casualties were incurred. A new round of peace talks will be held in Minsk on 24 and 26 December, announced Ukrainian President Petro Poroshenko, after a phone conversation between Angela Merkel, Francois Hollande and Vladimir Putin.
 23 December: Pro-Russian guerrillas blew up a key railway bridge over the Kalchyk river in Mariupol in the early hours of the morning. It is believed that the attackers previously shot three security guards from a nearby steel mill, killing one and wounding another. The bombing interrupted Mariupol's steel production and brought harbour operations to a standstill. Some hours later, members of the "Azov" battalion took charge of the security details at the main strategic facilities in the city. The Ukrainian Minister of Internal Affairs sent in 100 agents from the "Sokol" special operations force.
 25 December: Near Donetsk Ukraine's government and pro-Russian separatists began an exchange of  POWs, as agreed by the warring parties in Minsk on 24 December. By evening, BTR armoured personnel carriers and tanks from Shumy launched an attack on pro-Russian positions at Izotove.
 29 December: President Petro Poroshenko announced that in the course of the evening Ukrainian paratroopers fought off a major assault by pro-Russian forces near Donetsk airport. Three Ukrainian soldiers and 14 militants were reported killed, while one attacker was made prisoner. Later, the Ukrainian military reported that the attack took place in the village of Pisky, and was preceded by mortar and automatic grenade launcher fire. After the ill-fated storming, the rebels resumed the shelling using rocket propelled grenades, mortars and tanks. Heavy shelling resumed in Donetsk city, where artillery fire was reported in the district of Kalinin.

References

External links 
 Мамо, не плач - Список всех Погибших Солдат на Востоке Украины 2014 (АТО) - Мамо не плач (HD) [“Mum, do not cry” — List of all the soldiers killed in action in the Eastern Ukraine in 2014 (ATO)] (Video, in Ukrainian, 6:32)

2014
2014 in Ukraine
Donbas
Timelines of the Russo-Ukrainian War